The All-Ireland Junior B Club Hurling Championship is an annual inter-county club hurling competition organised by Killeedy GAA club since 2006 for eligible hurling clubs. Clubs qualify for the competition based on their performance in their county club championships.

The final, usually held in March, serves as the culmination of a series of games played during the winter and spring months, and the results determine which county's team receives the cup. The championship has always been played on a straight knockout basis whereby once a team loses they are eliminated from the series. In the present format, it begins in October with provincial championships held in Leinster and Munster, with the four respective champions and runners-up contesting the subsequent All-Ireland series.

No team has ever won the championship on more than one occasion. Tipperary clubs have accumulated the highest number of victories, with four wins. The championship has been won by 12 different clubs. The current champions are Loughrea, who secured the title after defeating St. Vincent's by 1-13 to 0-8 in the 2020 final.

Qualification

The All-Ireland Junior B Club HurlingChampionship features four teams in the final tournament. A number of teams contest the two provincial junior club championships with the four respective champions and runners-up automatically qualifying for the All-Ireland series.

List of finals

Top winners

References

Junior B